Aidan Knight (born October 23, 1986) is a Canadian singer-songwriter, multi-instrumentalist, and record producer from Victoria, British Columbia. He is the namesake of the experimental folk band Aidan Knight. He has also performed and recorded with The Zolas, Hannah Georgas, Dan Mangan, Karkwa, Jeremy Fisher, and We Are the City. Knight has released four studio albums.

Musical beginnings
Knight grew up in Victoria, British Columbia. Prior to forming his own musical project in 2008, Knight was a member of the bands Maurice, Toco & Jorge, Vegan Holocaust, and Counting Heartbeats. He also recorded and performed with Hannah Georgas, The Zolas, Dan Mangan, Karkwa, Jeremy Fisher, We Are the City, and David Vertesi.

Career
Knight helped establish the record label Adventure Boys Club, with founder Tyler Bancroft of the band Said the Whale. Its first release was Knight's debut album, Versicolour, on March 2, 2010. Previous digital EPs include Hi There and First Takes, a collection of demos and field recordings from 2007–2008. Versicolour was recorded in Langley at Buena Vista over the course of two years with producer Jonathan Anderson of Jonathan Inc.

Each Other, released on January 22, 2016, was created despite several obstacles including his bassist's health issues and his drummer leaving to finish school. In an interview with Transverso Media, Knight explained the struggles, saying, "I think it just mostly affected my sort of - how to put it eloquently - just my thoughts on how to keep going, you know, whatever the future was going to look like. And that seems really dramatic for me to say that now, but at the time it really felt like, 'Oh, maybe I just kind of hang up the towel here.' We had already spent the time and already spent the money on recording it so we would have needed a bunch more money to produce the songs and release the record and all, so maybe we cut out losses?"

On August 28, 2020, Aidan Knight released his self-titled fourth studio album on the indie label Full Time Hobby.

Discography

Studio albums
Versicolour (March 2, 2010)
Small Reveal (October 23, 2012)
Each Other (January 22, 2016)
Aidan Knight (August 28, 2020)

EPs
First Takes (August 12, 2008)
Hi There (October 16, 2008)
Friendly Fires (November 30, 2010)

References

External links
Aidan Knight
Aidan Knight on Facebook
Aidan Knight on Spotify

1986 births
Living people
Canadian folk singer-songwriters
Canadian male singer-songwriters
Musicians from Victoria, British Columbia
21st-century Canadian male singers